Harry Warren (c.1903 – 5 April 1968) was the manager of Southend United football club between 1946 and 1956.

Managerial career
Warren joined Folkestone Invicta in 1931 as a player-manager role. Warren left the club in 1939, joining Chelmsford City. During World War II, Southend United moved into Chelmsford's New Writtle Street Stadium. Warren became manager of both teams, remaining at Southend until 1956. Warren was manager of Coventry City between 1956 and 1957 having taken over from former Sweden international manager George Raynor.  He was succeeded by Billy Frith. He was asked to manage the Third Division South representative team in 1956/57.

References

Year of birth uncertain
1968 deaths
Folkestone Invicta F.C. players
Folkestone Invicta F.C. managers
Chelmsford City F.C. managers
Southend United F.C. managers
Coventry City F.C. managers
English football managers
English Football League managers
English footballers
Association footballers not categorized by position